Ivanskoye is a rural locality (a settlement) in Sudromskoye Rural Settlement of Velsky District, Arkhangelsk Oblast, Russia. The population was 128 as of 2014. There is 1 street.

Geography 
Ivanskoye is located on the Vaga River, 35 km northeast of Velsk (the district's administrative centre) by road. Ivanovskaya is the nearest rural locality.

References 

Rural localities in Velsky District